In British Royal Households, First Lady of the Bedchamber is the title of the highest of the ladies of the Bedchamber, those holding the official position of personal attendants on a queen or princess. The title had its equivalent in several European royal courts. The position is traditionally held by a female member of a noble family.

History
In the Middle Ages, Margaret of France, Queen of England, is noted to have had seven ladies-in-waiting: the three married ones were called Domina and the four unmarried maid of honour, but no principal lady-in-waiting is mentioned.

During the Tudor dynasty (1485-1603), the First Lady of the Bedchamber was called Chief Gentlewoman of the Privy Chamber. She had the highest rank among the Ladies of the Bedchamber, and their role was to act as the attendants and companions of the royal woman. The First Lady of the Bedchamber of a queen consort was the equivalent of the post of First Lord of the Bedchamber to a king.

England

First ladies of the Bedchamber under Elizabeth of York
 1485-1487: Cecily of York
 1487-1494: Anne of York (daughter of Edward IV)

First ladies of the Bedchamber and Chief Gentlewomen of the Privy Chamber under Elizabeth I
Under Elizabeth the role was also known as "Chief Gentlewoman of the Privy Chamber", for example during Parry's tenure of it.
1558 - 1565 - Kat Ashley
1565 - c.1572 - Blanche Parry (as Chief Gentlewoman of the Privy Chamber)
by 1572 - Catherine Howard, Countess of Nottingham

First ladies of the Bedchamber under Henrietta Maria of France
 1626-1652: Susan Feilding, Countess of Denbigh (also called mistress of the Robes and Groom of the Stool )

First ladies of the Bedchamber under Catherine of Braganza
 1660-1681: Barbara Howard, Countess of Suffolk
 1681-1685: Isabella de Nassau, Countess of Arlington

First ladies of the Bedchamber under Mary of Modena
 Lady Penelope O'Brien, Countess of Peterborough (also with title Groom of the Stool)
 Elizabeth Herbert, Marchioness of Powis

First ladies of the Bedchamber under Mary II of England
 1689-1694 : Golstine, A. van

United Kingdom
During the 17th and 18th centuries role often overlapped with or were retitled as Mistress of the Robes, until the latter role replaced it in the 1760s.

First ladies of the Bedchamber to Anne, Queen of Great Britain
dates unknown - Flower Backhouse

First ladies of the Bedchamber to Caroline of Ansbach
1714-1717 - Diana Beauclerk, Duchess of St Albans

First ladies of the Bedchamber to Augusta of Saxe-Gotha
dates unknown - Lady Jane Hamilton

See also
 Première dame d'honneur, French equivalent 
 Camarera mayor de Palacio, Spanish equivalent

References

Positions within the British Royal Household